Below is a list of heads of state and heads of government of Brazil. This is the list of Heads of State of Brazil, which brings together monarchs and presidents who held the head of state in Brazil during all historical periods in the country's history.

Colonial Brazil (1500–1815)
House of Avis

Brazil is discovered by Portuguese navigators on April 22, 1500, and becomes a Portuguese colony.

House of Habsburg

The House of Habsburg, known as the Philippine Dynasty, is the house that ruled Portugal from 1581 to 1640. The dynasty began with the acclamation of Philip II of Spain as Philip I of Portugal in 1580, officially recognized in 1581 by the Portuguese Cortes of Tomar. Philip I swore to rule Portugal as a kingdom separate from his Spanish domains, under the personal union known as the Iberian Union.

House of Braganza

The House of Braganza, also known as the Brigantine Dynasty, came to power in 1640, when John II, Duke of Braganza, claimed to be the rightful heir of the defunct House of Aviz, as he was the great great grandson of King Manuel I. John was proclaimed King John IV, and he deposed the House of Habsburg in the Portuguese Restoration War.

Kingdom of Brazil (1815–1822)

The house of Braganza continued to rule over Brazil, and on 16 December 1815, the Prince Regent John, the future king John VI raised Brazil to the status of a kingdom, thus making his mother, Maria I, the reigning Queen, the first Monarch of Brazil. The next year, 20 March 1816, John succeeded his mother as King of the united Luso-Brazilian monarchy.

Empire of Brazil (1822–1889)

The house of Braganza continued to rule over Brazil after Pedro I, son of John VI, was acclaimed the first Emperor of Brazil on 12 October 1822, having proclaimed the independence of the Kingdom of Brazil from Portugal. He was later succeeded on 7 April 1831 by his son Pedro II, the last monarch of Brazil, who reigned for 58 years.

The Old Republic (1889–1930)

On 15 November 1889, an unpopular coup d'état led by Marshal Deodoro da Fonseca deposed Emperor Pedro II and extinguished the stable 74-year-old Brazilian monarchy. The parliamentary monarch system was replaced by a presidential republic.

The Vargas Era (1930–1946)

The Vargas Era, also known as the Second Brazilian Republic and Third Brazilian Republic, began following the Brazilian revolution of 1930. Washington Luís was deposed on 24 October, and the Brazilian Military Junta took power. Vargas assumed leadership of the junta on 3 November 1930.

Populist Republic (1946–1964)

The Republic of 46 or the Fourth Brazilian Republic began after Vargas was deposed by a military coup in 1945. Nevertheless, Vargas would be elected president once again in 1950 until his later suicide, with his influence in Brazilian politics remaining until the end of the Fourth republic.

Military Dictatorship (1964–1985)

The Forth Republic would end after a military coup in 1964. This coup brought a military regime to power in Brazil that was politically aligned with the interests of the US government.

The New Republic (1985–present)

The military dictatorship lasted 21 years, until 1985, when Neves was indirectly elected Brazil's first civilian president since the 1960 elections. Known also as the Sixth Brazilian Republic or the New Republic, is the contemporary epoch in the history of Brazil.

Timeline

See also 
 History of Brazil
 History of Portugal
 List of presidents of Brazil
 List of Brazilian consorts
 List of Portuguese monarchs
 First ladies and gentlemen of Brazil
 List of presidents of Brazil by time in office
 List of monarchs of Brazil
 List of Brazilian regents

Notes

References

External links 
 Monarchs of Brazil (1815–1889)

Brazil
Nobility of the Americas
Brazilian monarchs
Brazil

Presidents
Presidents